Lojze Zupanc (21 September 1906 – 2 June 1973) was a Slovene writer, poet, playwright and journalist best known for his short stories based on folktales and other traditional stories.

Zupanc was born in Ljubljana in 1906. He trained as a teacher in Ljubljana and Maribor and worked as a teacher in Štrekljevec and numerous other places in White Carniola and the Kočevje area. During the Second World War he participated in the National Liberation Struggle and was imprisoned by the Italian Fascist authorities in 1943. His experiences of imprisonment are described in the autobiographical tale Sonce je umrlo (The Sun Has Died). After the war he worked in Gornji Grad and Škofja Loka, where he retired in 1965 and lived until his death in 1973.

He won the Levstik Award twice, in 1957 for his collection of stories Povodni mož v Savinji (The River Merman in the Savinja) and in 1971 for his collection of stories Zlato pod Blegošem (Gοld Under Mount Blegoš).

Published works

Fairy tales and fables 

 Belokranjske pripovedke (Tales form White Carniola), 1932
 Bili so trije velikani (There Were Once Three Giants), 1932 
 Dedek, povej (Tell Me Grandpa), 1939 
 Čudežni rog (The Magic Horn), 1944 
 Jezerka (The River Maiden), 1944 
 Svirel povodnega moža in druge belokranjske pripovedke (The River Neck and Other Tales from White Carniola), 1944 
 Velikan Nenasit (Neverful the Giant), 1944 
 Zaklad na Kučarju (The Treasure on Kučar), 1956 
 Povodni mož v Savinji (The River Merman in the Savinja), 1957
 Deklica in kač (The Girl and the Snake, 1959
 Čudežni studenec (The Miraculous Spring), 1960
 Kamniti most (The Stone Bridge), 1964 
 Sto belokranjskih (A Hundred from White Carniola), 1965
 Zlato pod Blegošem (Gold under Mount Blegoš), 1971
 Sinček palček (The Tiny Son), 1979
 Deklica s tremi lešniki (The Girl With Three Hazelnuts), 1984
 Pripovedke o Škofji Loki (Tales of Škofja Loka), 2008

Novels 

 Pod križem (Under the Cross), 1944
 Mlini stoje (The Mills Stand Still), 1945

Other stories 

 Stari Hrk (Old Hrk), 1934
 Tretji rod (The Third Generation), 1938
 Turjačani (Lords of Turjak), 1938
 Vklenjena mladost (A Chained Youth), 1943
 Sonce je umrlo (The Sun Has Died), 1964
 Anka Mikoljeva (Anka Mikol), 1979

References

Slovenian writers
Slovenian children's writers
1906 births
1973 deaths
Levstik Award laureates
Writers from Ljubljana
Yugoslav Partisans members